Ammagari Palle is a village located at a distance of around 1.5 kilometers from Sodam, Chittoor District, Andhra Pradesh. The village comes under Punganur constituency.

References 

Villages in Chittoor district